A vibration in a string is a wave. Resonance causes a vibrating string to produce a sound with constant frequency, i.e. constant pitch. If the length or tension of the string is correctly adjusted, the sound produced is a musical tone. Vibrating strings are the basis of string instruments such as guitars, cellos, and pianos.

Wave 

The velocity of propagation of a wave in a string is proportional to the square root of the force of tension of the string and inversely proportional to the square root of the linear density of the string:

This relationship was discovered by Vincenzo Galilei in the late 1500s.

Derivation

Source:

Let  be the length of a piece of string,  its mass, and  its linear density. Accordingly, using the small angle approximation, the horizontal tensions acting on both sides of the string segment are given by

From Newton's second law for the vertical component, the mass (which is the product of its linear density and length) of this piece times its acceleration, will be equal to the net force on the piece:

Using this fact and rearranging provides

In the limit that  approaches zero, the left hand side is the definition of the second derivative of :

Where  is the speed of propagation of the wave in the string (see the article on the wave equation for more about this). However, this derivation is only valid for small amplitude vibrations; for those of large amplitude,  is not a good approximation for the length of the string piece, the horizontal component of tension is not necessarily constant.

Frequency of the wave 
Once the speed of propagation is known, the frequency of the sound produced by the string can be calculated. The speed of propagation of a wave is equal to the wavelength  divided by the period , or multiplied by the frequency :

Hence one obtains Mersenne's laws:

Therefore:
 the shorter the string, the higher the frequency of the fundamental
 the higher the tension, the higher the frequency of the fundamental
 the lighter the string, the higher the frequency of the fundamental

And for a string under a tension T with linear density , then

Observing string vibrations 

One can see the waveforms on a vibrating string if the frequency is low enough and the vibrating string is held in front of a CRT screen such as one of a television or a computer (not of an analog oscilloscope).
This effect is called the stroboscopic effect, and the rate at which the string seems to vibrate is the difference between the frequency of the string and the refresh rate of the screen. The same can happen with a fluorescent lamp, at a rate that is the difference between the frequency of the string and the frequency of the alternating current.
(If the refresh rate of the screen equals the frequency of the string or an integer multiple thereof, the string will appear still but deformed.)
In daylight and other non-oscillating light sources, this effect does not occur and the string appears still but thicker, and lighter or blurred, due to persistence of vision.

A similar but more controllable effect can be obtained using a stroboscope. This device allows matching the frequency of the xenon flash lamp to the frequency of vibration of the string. In a dark room, this clearly shows the waveform. Otherwise, one can use bending or, perhaps more easily, by adjusting the machine heads, to obtain the same, or a multiple, of the AC frequency to achieve the same effect. For example, in the case of a guitar, the 6th (lowest pitched) string pressed to the third fret gives a G at 97.999 Hz. A slight adjustment can alter it to 100 Hz, exactly one octave above the alternating current frequency in Europe and most countries in Africa and Asia, 50 Hz. In most countries of the Americas—where the AC frequency is 60 Hz—altering A# on the fifth string, first fret from 116.54 Hz to 120 Hz produces a similar effect.

Real-world example

Given the above specs, what would the computed vibrational frequencies of the above strings' fundamental harmonics be if the strings were strung at the tensions recommended by the manufacturer?

To answer this, we can start with the formula in the preceding section, with :

(This substitution is convenient here since the string tensions provided by the manufacturer above are in pounds of force, which can be most conveniently converted to equivalent masses in kilograms via the familiar conversion factor 1 lb. = 453.59237 g.) The above formula then explicitly becomes:

Using this formula to compute  for string no. 1 above yields:

Repeating this computation for all six strings results in the following frequencies.  Shown next to each frequency is the musical note (in scientific pitch notation) in standard guitar tuning whose frequency is closest, confirming that stringing the above strings at the manufacturer-recommended tensions does indeed result in the standard pitches of a guitar:

See also 
 Fretted instruments
 Musical acoustics
 Vibrations of a circular drum
 Melde's experiment
 3rd bridge (harmonic resonance based on equal string divisions)
 String resonance
 Reflection phase change

References 

Specific

External links 
 "The Vibrating String" by Alain Goriely and Mark Robertson-Tessi, The Wolfram Demonstrations Project.

Mechanical vibrations
Sound
String instrument construction

da:Snorbølger
hu:Húr